The 2017 GoPro Grand Prix of Sonoma was the 17th and final race of the 2017 IndyCar Series season. The race was contested on September 17, 2017, on the IndyCar layout of Sonoma Raceway in Sonoma, California, and served as the season finale for the series. Josef Newgarden of Team Penske won the pole for the race; he would finish second, which allowed him to win the championship. Newgarden's teammate, Simon Pagenaud, won the race for his second consecutive Sonoma victory.

References

GoPro Grand Prix of Sonoma
GoPro Grand Prix of Sonoma
2017 GoPro Grand Prix of Sonoma
GoPro Grand Prix of Sonoma